Bruno Gomes de Oliveira Conceição (born 19 July 1996), known as Bruno Gomes or simply Bruno, is a Brazilian professional footballer who plays as a forward for Portuguese club Nacional.

Club career

Internacional
Following a string of impressive performances at youth level with Desportivo Brasil, during which time he scored more than 130 goals and won three consecutive age-group Golden Boot awards, Gomes was signed by Internacional in 2013. Prior to signing for the Brazilian Série A side he had previously undergone a trial at Premier League club Manchester United in 2012. In 2014, he was part of the Inter side which won the Campeonato Brasileiro Sub-20.

Loan to Genoa
In September 2015, Gomes underwent a medical Serie A side Genoa but his move from Internacional was denied by FIFA as the documentation required for the transfer to go through failed to arrive on time.
Having trained with the club in the interim, Gomes' signing was finally confirmed on 5 January 2016 on a six-month loan deal, with Genoa reserving the option to buy.

In May 2016, having failed to make a single senior appearance for the club during his loan spell, Gomes returned to Brazil pending a decision by Genoa as to whether or not to sign him permanently.

Estoril
At the end of the Serie A season Gomes returned to Internacional having failed to feature for the first team during his loan spell at Genoa. Genoa subsequently opted against exercising their option to sign him permanently and on 22 July 2016 he was loaned to Portuguese Primeira Liga side Estoril for the 2016–17 season.

Gomes made his Primeira Liga debut on 11 September, coming on as a second-half substitute for Kléber in a 0–0 draw with Paços de Ferreira. On 23 September he scored the first professional goals of his career, coming off the bench to net a brace in a 4–2 loss to Sporting CP. 

Gomes scored his first cup goal two months later on 19 November, netting in stoppage-time in a 2–0 Taça de Portugal victory over Cova da Piedade. He followed the goal up with braces against Sanjoanense and Benfica, though the latter was not enough to prevent Estoril being knocked out of the tournament in the semi-finals. In total, he amassed 28 appearances for the season and scored eight goals.

In August 2017, Gomes terminated his contract with Internacional in order to sign with Estoril permanently. Internacional approached FIFA with an appeal following his move, claiming that they had rejected both a transfer offer from Estoril, and a request from the player for the rescission and that he was still contracted to the club. Despite Internacional's contestations, Estoril registered Gomes for the season on 31 August. He ultimately made 21 appearances for the season, scoring once.

Loan to Vitória and Aves
On 10 July 2018, Gomes returned to Brazil where he joined Vitória on a season long loan. He departed the following month, however, having not played a single match, to join Portuguese side Aves on loan instead.

Modena
On 22 November 2019, he returned to Italy, joining Serie C club Modena.

Nacional
On 1 July 2021, he signed a three-year contract with Nacional in Portugal.

Style of play
Due to his pace and explosiveness, Gomes was dubbed "the new Pato" by Brazilian media during the early stages of his career in comparison to fellow Brazilian forward Alexandre Pato. He plays predominantly as  a striker or secondary striker but he is also adept at playing down the left wing.

Career statistics

Club

 

1 Includes Copa do Brasil and Taça de Portugal matches.
2 Includes Taça da Liga matches

References 

1996 births
Living people
Brazilian footballers
Association football forwards
Serie A players
Primeira Liga players
Serie C players
Liga Portugal 2 players
Genoa C.F.C. players
Sport Club Internacional players
Desportivo Brasil players
Esporte Clube Vitória players
G.D. Estoril Praia players
C.D. Aves players
Modena F.C. players
Paraná Clube players
C.D. Nacional players
Brazilian expatriate footballers
Expatriate footballers in Italy
Expatriate footballers in Portugal
Footballers from São Paulo
Brazilian expatriate sportspeople in Italy